Edmund Emanuel Dell (15 August 1921 – 1 November 1999) was a British politician and businessman.

Early life 
Dell was born in London, the son of a Jewish manufacturer. In the Second World War he served in the Royal Artillery, reaching the rank of lieutenant. He was educated at Dame Alice Owen's School and Queen's College, Oxford where he was a member of the Communist Party, as his future ministerial colleague Denis Healey had been before the war. He graduated with first class honours in Modern History in 1947.

Early career and politics
Dell began work for Imperial Chemical Industries (ICI) in Manchester as an overseas sales manager, specialising in Latin American trade and eventually rose to Vice President of the Plastics Division. However, he began to find himself in the difficult position of balancing a career in business with Labour politics. He was elected to Manchester City Council in 1953, and served for seven years.

Political career

Labour party 
Dell stood unsuccessfully for Parliament in 1955 in Middleton and Prestwich. He was dissuaded from standing for Parliament in 1959 by ICI, on the grounds that it would make promotion to the highest ranks of the company difficult. However, he eventually gave in to the temptation of national politics, and was elected to Parliament as the Labour Member of Parliament for Birkenhead in 1964. He served as Parliamentary Private Secretary to Jack Diamond, then as Parliamentary Under-Secretary of State at the Ministry of Technology under Tony Benn in 1966 and the Department of Economic Affairs under Peter Shore in 1967. The following year, he was promoted to Minister of State for Trade. Switched to the Department of Employment in 1969, he was made a Privy Councillor in 1970.

Dell was one of the 69 rebel Labour MPs who sided with the Conservative government and voted for Britain's entry into the European Communities in 1971. He subsequently refused to take a frontbench role while in opposition and served as Chairman of the Public Accounts Committee. When Harold Wilson returned to 10 Downing Street as Prime Minister in 1974, Dell became Paymaster General, then Secretary of State for Trade and President of the Board of Trade between 1976 and 1978 in James Callaghan's government. He was tipped to become Chancellor of the Exchequer but resigned his seat, increasingly disillusioned by Labour's drift to the Left as he moved sharply to the Right. He had always been much more oriented toward free-market capitalism than his comrades in the Labour Party, and grew increasingly uncomfortable in a party that was growing increasingly dominated by advocates of a planned economy and corporatism.

SDP and Liberal Democrats 
Dell joined the new Social Democratic Party and, after its merger with the Liberal Party in 1988, he was a member of the Liberal Democrats. He served as a trustee of both the SDP and the Liberal Democrats and served as one of SDP's three representatives during emergency negotiations with the Liberals in January 1988 when it appeared the two parties' merger might fall through after the failed launch by David Steel and Bob Maclennan of the joint manifesto, Voices and Choices.

Post-Parliament life 
After Parliament, Dell had a career in business as chairman of Guinness Peat, founding chairman of Channel 4 and as a director of Shell Trading. In 1991-2 he was president of the London Chamber of Commerce and Industry. In 1996, he wrote The Chancellors: A History of Chancellors of the Exchequer 1945-90. His book, A Strange Eventful History, Democratic Socialism in Britain was published posthumously in 2000. It was a summation of his critique of the Labour Party's long history being attached to what he saw as "much Keynesianism and too much of the detritus of socialism." Although he had voted for Labour in 1992 and 1997, he still thought that New Labour ultimately "will not fully have entered the modern world until it learns to love capitalism with all its warts." He was especially angry with both parties in 1950-51 for refusing to join the European Community at an early stage when it could have a powerful voice. He said it represented, "the British abdication of leadership in Europe."

Personal life 
Dell was married to Susan Gottschalk for 36 years.

References

External links 
 

|-

|-

|-

1921 births
1999 deaths
Alumni of The Queen's College, Oxford
British Army personnel of World War II
British Secretaries of State
Businesspeople from London
Channel 4 people
Councillors in Manchester
English Jews
English television executives
Imperial Chemical Industries people
Jewish British politicians
Labour Party (UK) MPs for English constituencies
Liberal Democrats (UK) politicians
Members of the Privy Council of the United Kingdom
Ministers in the Wilson governments, 1964–1970
People educated at Dame Alice Owen's School
Politicians from London
Presidents of the Board of Trade
Royal Artillery officers
Social Democratic Party (UK) politicians
UK MPs 1964–1966
UK MPs 1966–1970
UK MPs 1970–1974
UK MPs 1974
UK MPs 1974–1979
United Kingdom Paymasters General
20th-century English businesspeople